Adem Kılıççı (born March 5, 1986) is a Turkish amateur boxer in the middleweight division. At , he weighs . He is currently a member of the Fenerbahçe Boxing Club in Istanbul. On 1 February 2017, the IOC disqualified Kılıççı from the 2012 Olympic Games due to an adverse test for turinabol, a finding from the IOC's 2016 wave of retesting of samples from previous Games. Kılıççı had ranked 5th in men's 69–75 kg boxing.

Welterweight

Kılıççı won a silver medal at the 2004 World University Boxing Championship in Antalya, Turkey.

Kılıççı participated at the 2007 World Amateur Boxing Championships held in Chicago, USA and won the bronze medal at welterweight.

At the 2008 Olympics he was upset in the first round by British boxer Billy Joe Saunders 3:14 and decided to move up to middleweight.

Middleweight

In 2009, Kılıcı gained the silver medal at the Mediterranean Games in Pescara, Italy losing to Rachid Hamani in the final.

He won the silver medal at the 2011 European Amateur Championships held in Ankara, Turkey losing to Maxim Koptyakov (RUS).

At the 2012 Olympics he defeated Nursahat Pazziyev and Aleksandar Drenovak then lost 13:17 to Ryōta Murata. But he tested positive for steroid turinabol after re-analysis of his samples, and was disqualified. 
He won a gold medal at the 2013 Mediterranean Games held in Mersin, Turkey.

Competitions

References

Sportspeople from Ağrı
Living people
Fenerbahçe boxers
Turkish sportspeople in doping cases
Doping cases in boxing
Boxers at the 2008 Summer Olympics
Boxers at the 2012 Summer Olympics
Olympic boxers of Turkey
1986 births
Welterweight boxers
Turkish male boxers
AIBA World Boxing Championships medalists
Mediterranean Games gold medalists for Turkey
Mediterranean Games silver medalists for Turkey
Competitors at the 2009 Mediterranean Games
Competitors at the 2013 Mediterranean Games
Mediterranean Games medalists in boxing
Survivor Turkey contestants